Mertert is a commune and town in eastern Luxembourg, on the border with Germany. It is part of the canton of Grevenmacher. The commune consists of the towns of Mertert and Wasserbillig. Mertert has a river port on the Moselle, the largest in Luxembourg.  The commune's administrative centre is Wasserbillig.

, the town of Mertert, which lies in the south of the commune, has a population of 1,101.  Another town within the commune is Wasserbillig.

Population

References

External links
 

 
Communes in Grevenmacher (canton)
Towns in Luxembourg
Germany–Luxembourg border crossings